Fiskidagurinn mikli ("The Great Fish Day") is an annual festival held in Dalvík, Iceland.

References

External links
 Official website (in Icelandic).

Cultural festivals in Iceland
Annual events in Iceland
Dalvík
Food and drink festivals in Iceland
Festivals in Dalvík